Uzbekfilm is the largest and oldest film studio  in Uzbekistan. It was established on July 1, 1925.

The company was initially called Sharq Yulduzi (Eastern Star). In 1936, it was renamed to Uzbekfilm. During the Soviet-German war against Nazi Germany and its allies, the company was called Tashkent Film Studio. In 1958, it was renamed back to Uzbekfilm.

Since its founding Uzbekfilm has produced about 400 feature films and 100 animated films. Some of the most popular films produced by Uzbekfilm include Maftuningman (1958), Mahallada duv-duv gap (1960), Yor-yor (1964), Shum bola (1977), Toʻylar muborak (1978), Suyunchi (1982), Kelinlar qoʻzgʻoloni (1984), Armon (1986), and Abdullajon (1991).

After Uzbekistan became independent in 1991, the government of the country took full control of the studio. In 1996, Uzbekfilm was turned into an open joint-stock company. The studio produces half a dozen feature-length films a year.

See also
Cinema of Uzbekistan

References

Companies based in Tashkent
Film production companies of Uzbekistan
Film production companies of the Soviet Union
Film studios
1925 establishments in the Soviet Union
Mass media companies established in 1925